Welcome is an unincorporated community in northwest Austin County, Texas, United States. According to the Handbook of Texas, the community had a population of 150 in 2000. It is located within the Greater Houston metropolitan area.

History
The land along Pecan Creek was settled by Anglo-Americans as early as the late 1820s. By 1852, German immigrants moved into the area. A leading member of the German community was schoolmaster J. F. Schmidt from Oldenburg, who later formed a singing club. Liking the pleasant countryside and friendly people, Schmidt named the town Welcome. In 1871 a post office opened in the settlement. By 1936 there were approximately 200 persons in the community with four commercial establishments. The population dwindled to about 60 souls with two businesses in 1950. The town recovered so that there were 175 inhabitants in 1965. From 1990 to 2000, the population was around 150 persons.

Geography
At the intersection with Thielemann Road at Welcome, FM 109 turns from a northerly to a northeasterly direction. Thielemann Road goes northwest and connects with Speiss, Turnbow, Garlin and Zetter Roads. The addresses in Welcome all carry the 78944 zip code, the same as Industry. Bleiblerville is to the southeast on FM 2502.

Education
J F Schmidt established the first school in the community on the west banks of Pecan Creek. Welcome is served by the Bellville Independent School District.

References

Unincorporated communities in Austin County, Texas
Unincorporated communities in Texas